Simon Munn (born 31 January 1968) is a British wheelchair basketball player. He is originally from Aylesbury.

He had his left leg amputated after a railway accident. Taking a shortcut home from a pub, he slipped and fell face down with his legs on the rail track.  The driver of the train saw him but was unable to stop in time.  Upon stopping, the driver and guard of the train retraced their steps and discovered Munn had crawled from the scene of the accident. They found him by following the trail of blood. They called an ambulance and with the help of a passing motorist, who is believed to have been an off-duty nurse, using their hi viz vests and her golf clubs they tourniquets both his legs to stop the bleeding.

As a wheelchair basketball player, Munn has played for clubs including Super League Club MK Aces, Tameside Owls and London Club Capital City. He is classified as a 4 point player. He received the British Wheelchair Sport Awards in 2007.

Munn was part of Great Britain's wheelchair basketball team at the 1992, 1996, 2000, 2004, 2008, 2012, and 2016 Summer Paralympics. The team took the silver medal in 1996, and the bronze in 2004 and 2008. He planned to retire as a basketball player after the 2012 Summer Paralympics in London, but eventually competed in his seventh Paralympics in Rio de Janeiro in 2016.

References

External links
 
 

1968 births
Living people
British men's wheelchair basketball players
Paralympic wheelchair basketball players of Great Britain
Paralympic bronze medalists for Great Britain
Paralympic silver medalists for Great Britain
Paralympic medalists in wheelchair basketball
Wheelchair category Paralympic competitors
Wheelchair basketball players at the 1992 Summer Paralympics
Wheelchair basketball players at the 1996 Summer Paralympics
Wheelchair basketball players at the 2000 Summer Paralympics
Wheelchair basketball players at the 2004 Summer Paralympics
Wheelchair basketball players at the 2008 Summer Paralympics
Wheelchair basketball players at the 2012 Summer Paralympics
Wheelchair basketball players at the 2016 Summer Paralympics
Medalists at the 1996 Summer Paralympics
Medalists at the 2004 Summer Paralympics
Medalists at the 2008 Summer Paralympics
Medalists at the 2016 Summer Paralympics